The 2006 Challenge Bell was a tennis tournament played on indoor carpet courts at the PEPS de l'Université Laval in Quebec City in Canada that was part of Tier III of the 2006 WTA Tour. It was the 14th edition of the Challenge Bell, and was held from October 30 through November 5, 2006. Marion Bartoli won the singles title.

Champions

Singles

 Marion Bartoli def.  Olga Poutchkova, 6–0, 6–0
It was Bartoli's 3rd title of the year and the 3rd of her career.

Doubles

 Carly Gullickson /  Laura Granville def.  Jill Craybas /  Alina Jidkova, 6–3, 6–4
It was Gullickson's only title of the year and the 2nd of her career. It was Granville's only title of the year and the 2nd of her career.

External links
Official website

Challenge Bell
Tournoi de Québec
Challenge Bell
2000s in Quebec City